Third Lake is a village in Lake County, Illinois, United States. Per the 2020 census, the population was 1,111.

Geography
Third Lake is located at  (42.368117, -88.008903).

Major streets
 
 Rollins Road
 Washington Street

Demographics

2020 census

Note: the US Census treats Hispanic/Latino as an ethnic category. This table excludes Latinos from the racial categories and assigns them to a separate category. Hispanics/Latinos can be of any race.

2000 Census
As of the census of 2000, there were 1,355 people, 428 households, and 369 families living in the village. The racial makeup of the village was 95.50% White, 0.52% African American, 1.92% Asian, 0.59% from other races, and 1.48% from two or more races. Hispanic or Latino of any race were 3.32% of the population.

There were 428 households, out of which 50.5% had children under the age of 18 living with them, 81.5% were married couples living together, 4.0% had a female householder with no husband present, and 13.6% were non-families. 9.3% of all households were made up of individuals, and 2.3% had someone living alone who was 65 years of age or older. The average household size was 3.14 and the average family size was 3.39.

In the village, the population was spread out, with 31.7% under the age of 18, 6.6% from 18 to 24, 30.1% from 25 to 44, 27.5% from 45 to 64, and 4.1% who were 65 years of age or older. The median age was 37 years. For every 100 females, there were 105.9 males. For every 100 females age 18 and over, there were 100.4 males.

The median income for a household in the village was $96,719, and the median income for a family was $101,850. Males had a median income of $68,068 versus $47,500 for females. The per capita income for the village was $34,921. About 1.4% of families and 2.7% of the population were below the poverty line, including 2.7% of those under age 18 and 9.4% of those age 65 or over.

As of the 2010 US Census, there were 1,182 people living in the village. The racial makeup of the village was 95.01% White, 0.34% African American, 0.34% Native American, 1.35% Asian, 1.27% from other races, and 1.69% from two or more races. Hispanic or Latino of any race were 5.84% of the population.

Orthodox church and New Gračanica Monastery
Third Lake has the headquarters of the Serbian Orthodox Diocese of New Gracanica – Midwestern America. Third Lake is home to the New Gračanica church and monastery complex, which houses a detailed replica of the Gračanica monastery in Kosovo. Built on land that the Most Holy Mother of God Serbian Association purchased in 1977, New Gračanica Church and the main building on its grounds dedicated to the feast of the "Protection of the Most Holy Mother of God" were completed and consecrated in 1984. It is an impressive architectural replica of the original Gračanica of Kosovo, but built in a scale eighteen percent larger than the original. New Gračanica is richly attired with detail such as hand-carved wooden entrance doors depicting 23 monasteries and churches from various regions of Serbia.

References

External links

Village of Third Lake official website

Villages in Illinois
Villages in Lake County, Illinois